Spring Hill is a historic home located at Ivy, Albemarle County, Virginia. The main house dates to about 1785, and is a two-story, brick dwelling expanded in the 1870s and 1930s.  The oldest building on the property is the brick field slave quarters, built about 1765, and once served as the main house.  Also on the property are a brick dairy and kitchen.  The house is representative of the evolution and integration of academic and vernacular architectural styles covering over two centuries of Albemarle County settlement.

It was added to the National Register of Historic Places in 1983.

References

External links
Spring Hill Claim House, State Route 637, Ivy, Albemarle County, VA: 5 measured drawing at Historic American Buildings Survey

Houses on the National Register of Historic Places in Virginia
Houses completed in 1765
Houses in Albemarle County, Virginia
National Register of Historic Places in Albemarle County, Virginia
Historic American Buildings Survey in Virginia
Slave cabins and quarters in the United States